The Ride is a studio album by Los Lobos. It was released on May 4, 2004, by Hollywood / Mammoth Records. It features numerous guest musicians, including Bobby Womack, Tom Waits, Rubén Blades, Dave Alvin, Richard Thompson, Elvis Costello, Mavis Staples, and Garth Hudson. The album contains new material and also new versions of earlier Los Lobos songs.

Track listing

Personnel 

The specific contributions of the members of Los Lobos are not mentionedon the album, but this is the usual:

 David Hidalgo – vocals, guitar, accordion, fiddle, requinto jarocho
 Louie Pérez – vocals, guitar, drums, jarana
 Cesar Rosas – vocals, guitar, bajo sexto
 Conrad Lozano – vocals, bass, guitarron
 Steve Berlin – keyboards, woodwinds

Additional musicians
Credits adapted from the album's liner notes.

 Cougar Estrada – drums, percussion on all tracks
 Victor Bisetti – additional percussion
 Little Willy G. – vocals (3)
 Dave Alvin – vocals (5)
 Bobby Womack – vocals (6)
 Tom Waits – vocals (7)
 Martha Gonzalez – vocals (7)
 Rubén Blades – vocals (9)
 Richard Thompson – vocals (10)
 Elvis Costello – vocals (11)
 Mavis Staples – vocals (12)
 Elfego Buendia – vocals (1)
 Alejandro Flores – quinta guapanguera, requinto (1)
 Emmanuel de Real – jarana, keyboards (1)
 Joselo Rangel – guitar (1)
 Garth Hudson – keyboards (1, 11, 13)
 Mitchell Froom - keyboards (2)
 Greg Leisz - pedal steel guitar (2, 5, 11)
 Rev. Charles Williams - piano (6), organ (6), clavinet (12)
 Francisco Torres - trombone (7)
 Alberto Salas - piano (9)
 Lonnie Jordan - organ (12)

Production
 Los Lobos – producer
 Robert Carranza – engineer, mixing
 Seth McLain – engineer 
 Jeff Hooper – engineer 
 Tom Waits – engineer
 Joe Ross – engineer  
 Mat Lejeune – engineer 
 Emmanuel de Real – engineer 
 Luis Román – engineer 
 Chris Holmes – mixing assistant
 Robert Hadley – mastering
 Louie Perez – art direction
 Al Quattrocchi – art direction
 Jeff Smith – art direction
 Tornado Design – design, photography 
 Max Aguilera-Hellweg – photography

Billboard charts

References

Los Lobos albums
2004 albums